The Spokane Women's Open was a professional golf tournament on the LPGA Tour from 1959 to 1963, played in Spokane, Washington. It was held at the recently constructed Esmeralda Golf Course, a municipal facility in northeast Spokane. Originally a 72-hole event at par-72, it was reduced to 54 holes at par-70 for its final edition.

Winners

References

External links
Spokane Golf.org - Esmeralda Golf Club

Former LPGA Tour events
Golf in Washington (state)
Sports in Spokane, Washington
Recurring sporting events established in 1959
Recurring events disestablished in 1963
1959 establishments in Washington (state)
1963 disestablishments in Washington (state)
Women's sports in Washington (state)